The 1981 Alan King Tennis Classic, also known as the Alan King-Caesars Palace Tennis Classic, was a men's tennis tournament played on outdoor hard courts at the Caesars Palace in Las Vegas, United States. It was the tenth edition of the event and was part of the Super Series of the 1981 Volvo Grand Prix circuit. The tournament was held from April 20 through April 26, 1981. First-seeded Ivan Lendl won the singles title and the accompanying $60,000 first-prize money.

Finals

Singles
 Ivan Lendl defeated  Harold Solomon 6–4, 6–2
 It was Lendl's 2nd singles title of the year and the 9th of his career.

Doubles
 John McEnroe /  Peter Fleming defeated  Tracy Delatte /  Trey Waltke 6–3, 7–6

References

External links
 ITF tournament edition details

Alan King Tennis Classic
Alan King Tennis Classic
Tennis in Las Vegas
Alan King Tennis Classic
Alan King Tennis Classic
Alan King Tennis Classic